Synchrotron radiation (also known as magnetobremsstrahlung radiation) is the electromagnetic radiation emitted when relativistic charged particles are subject to an acceleration perpendicular to their velocity. It is produced artificially in some types of particle accelerators, or naturally by fast electrons moving through magnetic fields. The radiation produced in this way has a characteristic polarization and the frequencies generated can range over a large portion of the electromagnetic spectrum.

Synchrotron radiation is similar to bremsstrahlung radiation, which is emitted by a charged particle when the acceleration is parallel to the direction of motion.  The general term for radiation emitted by particles in a magnetic field is gyromagnetic radiation, for which synchrotron radiation is the ultra-relativistic special case. Radiation emitted by charged particles moving non-relativistically in a magnetic field is called cyclotron emission. For particles in the mildly relativistic range (≈85% of the speed of light), the emission is termed gyro-synchrotron radiation.

In astrophysics, synchrotron emission occurs, for instance, due to ultra-relativistic motion of a charged particle around a black hole. When the source follows a circular geodesic around the black hole, the synchrotron radiation occurs for orbits close to the photosphere where the motion is in the ultra-relativistic regime.

History

Synchrotron radiation was first observed by technician Floyd Haber, on April 24, 1947, at the 70 MeV electron synchrotron of the General Electric research laboratory in Schenectady, New York. While this was not the first synchrotron built, it was the first with a transparent vacuum tube, allowing the radiation to be directly observed.

As recounted by Herbert Pollock:

Description
A direct consequence of Maxwell's equations is that accelerated charged particles always emit electromagnetic radiation. Synchrotron radiation is the special case of charged particles moving at relativistic speed undergoing acceleration perpendicular to their direction of motion, typically in a magnetic field. In such a field, the force due to the field is always perpendicular to both the direction of motion and to the direction of field, as shown by the Lorentz force law.

The power carried by the radiation is found (in SI units) by the relativistic Larmor formula:

where
  is the vacuum permittivity,
  is the particle charge,
  is the magnitude of the acceleration,
  is the speed of light,
  is the Lorentz factor.

The force on the emitting electron is given by the Abraham–Lorentz–Dirac force.

When the radiation is emitted by a particle moving in a plane, the radiation is linearly polarized when observed in that plane, and circularly polarized when observed at a small angle.

Synchrotron radiation from accelerators

Circular accelerators will always produce gyromagnetic radiation as the particles are deflected in the magnetic field. However, the quantity and properties of the radiation are highly dependent on the nature of the acceleration taking place.

Energy loss from synchrotron radiation in circular accelerators was originally considered a nuisance, as additional energy must be supplied to the beam in order to offset the losses.  However, beginning in the 1980s, circular electron accelerators known as light sources have been constructed to deliberately produce intense beams of synchrotron radiation for research.

Synchrotron radiation in astronomy

Synchrotron radiation is also generated by astronomical objects, typically where relativistic electrons spiral (and hence change velocity) through magnetic fields.
Two of its characteristics include power-law energy spectra and polarization. It is considered to be one of the most powerful tools in the study of extra-solar magnetic fields wherever relativistic charged particles are present. Most known cosmic radio sources emit synchrotron radiation. It is often used to estimate the strength of large cosmic magnetic fields as well as analyze the contents of the interstellar and intergalactic media.

History of detection
This type of radiation was first detected in a jet emitted by Messier 87 in 1956 by Geoffrey R. Burbidge, who saw it as confirmation of a prediction by Iosif S. Shklovsky in 1953. However, it had been predicted earlier (1950) by Hannes Alfvén and Nicolai Herlofson. Solar flares accelerate particles that emit in this way, as suggested by R. Giovanelli in 1948 and described by J.H. Piddington in 1952.

T. K. Breus noted that questions of priority on the history of astrophysical synchrotron radiation are complicated, writing:

From supermassive black holes 

It has been suggested that supermassive black holes produce synchrotron radiation in "jets", generated by the gravitational acceleration of ions in their polar magnetic fields. The nearest such observed jet is from the core of the galaxy Messier 87.  This jet is interesting for producing the illusion of superluminal motion as observed from the frame of Earth. This phenomenon is caused because the jets are travelling very near the speed of light and at a very small angle towards the observer. Because at every point of their path the high-velocity jets are emitting light, the light they emit does not approach the observer much more quickly than the jet itself. Light emitted over hundreds of years of travel thus arrives at the observer over a much smaller time period, giving the illusion of faster than light travel, despite the fact that there is actually no violation of special relativity.

Pulsar wind nebulae
A class of astronomical sources where synchrotron emission is important is pulsar wind nebulae, also known as plerions, of which the Crab nebula and its associated pulsar are archetypal.
Pulsed emission gamma-ray radiation from the Crab has recently been observed up to ≥25 GeV, probably due to synchrotron emission by electrons trapped in the strong magnetic field around the pulsar.
Polarization in the Crab nebula at energies from 0.1 to 1.0 MeV, illustrates this typical property of synchrotron radiation.

Interstellar and intergalactic media
Much of what is known about the magnetic environment of the interstellar medium and intergalactic medium is derived from observations of synchrotron radiation. Cosmic ray electrons moving through the medium interact with relativistic plasma and emit synchrotron radiation which is detected on Earth. The properties of the radiation allow astronomers to make inferences about the magnetic field strength and orientation in these regions. However, accurate calculations of field strength cannot be made without knowing the relativistic electron density.

See also

Notes

References
 Brau, Charles A. Modern Problems in Classical Electrodynamics. Oxford University Press, 2004. .
 Jackson, John David. Classical Electrodynamics. John Wiley & Sons, 1999.

External links
 Cosmic Magnetobremsstrahlung (synchrotron Radiation), by Ginzburg, V. L., Syrovatskii, S. I., ARAA, 1965
 Developments in the Theory of Synchrotron Radiation and its Reabsorption, by Ginzburg, V. L., Syrovatskii, S. I., ARAA, 1969
 Lightsources.org
 BioSync – a structural biologist's resource for high energy data collection facilities
 X-Ray Data Booklet

 
Particle physics
Synchrotron-related techniques
Electromagnetic radiation
Experimental particle physics